Ismol Family is a Philippine television situational comedy series broadcast by GMA Network. Directed by Dominic Zapata, it stars Ryan Agoncillo and Carla Abellana. It premiered on June 22, 2014 on the network's Sunday Grande sa Gabi line up replacing Picture! Picture!. The series concluded on November 6, 2016 with a total of 125 episodes. It was replaced by Tsuperhero in its timeslot.

The series is streaming online on YouTube.

Cast and characters

Lead cast
 Ryan Agoncillo as Jingo Ismol
 Carla Abellana as Majay Ismol

Supporting cast
 Marc Justine Alvarez as PJ Ismol
 Carmi Martin as Apolonia "Apple" Laqui
 Mikael Daez as Bernie
 Pekto as Roberto "Bobong" Laqui
 Bianca Umali as Yumi Laqui
 Miguel Tanfelix as Tan-Tan
 Kevin Santos as Lance
 Mahal as Big Boss
 Boobay as Lora
 Dello as himself
 James Teng as Nathan
 Bernadette Bansil as Dianne
 Pollana Villamor Tangco as Jackie
 Alvin Ronquillo as Yakkie
 Ashley Mendoza as Krippy
 Natalia Moon as Natalia
 Sky Teotico as Amboy

Recurring cast
 Lindsay de Vera as Kitten
 Roi Vinzon as Bernie's father
 Chanda Romero as China

Ratings
According to AGB Nielsen Philippines' Mega Manila household television ratings, the pilot episode of Ismol Family earned a 17.4% rating. While the final episode scored a 22.8% rating in Urban Luzon.

Accolades

References

External links
 

2014 Philippine television series debuts
2016 Philippine television series endings
Filipino-language television shows
GMA Network original programming
Philippine comedy television series
Philippine television sitcoms
Television shows set in the Philippines